Clanoptilus marginellus is a species of beetles belonging to the family Melyridae.

Distribution
This species is present in most of Europe.

References

Beetles described in 1790
Melyridae